Roman Aleksandrovich Kozlov (born 30 September 1981) is a Kazakhstani former ice hockey forward. He spent most of his career in the Russian lower leagues, and also played for the Kazakhstan national team at five World Championships.

References

External links
 

Living people
1981 births
Asian Games medalists in ice hockey
Asian Games silver medalists for Kazakhstan
Barys Nur-Sultan players
HC Neftekhimik Nizhnekamsk players
Ice hockey players at the 2003 Asian Winter Games
Kazakhstani ice hockey centres
Kazzinc-Torpedo players
Medalists at the 2003 Asian Winter Games
Sportspeople from Oskemen
Zauralie Kurgan players